The FIA WTCC Race of China is a round of the World Touring Car Championship currently held at the Shanghai International Circuit located in Shanghai, China. The 2011 round was first announced to be held at the Guangdong International Circuit, but was later moved to Tianma Circuit for an unspecified reason. For 2012 the race moved to the nearby Shanghai International Circuit.

The race made its debut in the World Touring Car Championship as the 11th round of the 2011 World Touring Car Championship season.

Winners

References

China
China
Race of China